Agecroft Rowing Club is a rowing club based at Salford Quays, Greater Manchester, England. Its current location is its third within today's City of Salford on a site close to the city centre of Manchester.

History 

There has been rowing in Manchester and Salford since 1823, with more than 15 clubs operating during the 1860s. Agecroft R.C. was formed by the gradual merging of these River Irwell-based clubs. Agecroft R.C. was established in Oct 1861 by Ishmael Lythgoe with its first boat house in the grounds of Agecroft Hall at Pendlebury before the manor house was sold and rebuilt by the James River in Virginia, USA. The club soon moved to the River Irwell further upstream at Littleton Road and were based there for over a hundred years. However, in early 2000s, the stretch of river had been allowed to return more to reeds to support fishing and the boathouse lay on part of a new flood plain so the club moved to a new boathouse close to Manchester City Centre at Salford Quays. This new home triggered a huge growth in club size and successes throughout the UK.

Current activities 
The club regularly competes across the UK at all levels and has a broad membership base, from complete novices and juniors through to semi-professional athletes competing at international level. The club regularly hosts a small boats head race in the winter and supports a British Rowing world class start coach.

The club hosts a wide variety of rowers of different abilities, ambitions and ages, with a large membership and a wide variety of members from juniors through students to masters. The club has achieved qualifications and wins at the British Rowing Championships, Nottingham and Henley Royal Regatta and a course record at Henley Women's Regatta in the Intermediate 4+ event.

International performances

The club has been successful in the World Class Start squad with wins in the World Under 23s coxless pairs and a Home Countries win for England in the single sculls by Olivia Whitlam who has since gone on to represent GB at the 2008 and 2012 Olympics and the three intervening World Championships. Other internationals since 2010 include Brendan Crean (4x 2010), Graeme Thomas (World Cup win Australia 2013), Zak Lee-Green (lwt 4x u23 bronze 2010),  Oli Lee (GB U23 4x 2010), Rebecca Chin (GB U23 eight Bronze, 2012) and Olivia Oakes (GB U23 eight bronze 2012). Both Brendan (England) and Graeme (Wales) have also won National Championship gold medals in 1x and Home Countries Internationals.Graeme has gone on to represent GB at 3 successive Worlds, winning silver and Bronze. He missed the Rio Olympics due to ill health, but was named as part of the GB Rowing Team for Tokyo 2021  after winning a bronze medal in the 2021 European Championships held in Varese.
Zak Lee Green is another successful Agecroft graduate and was part of the GB Lightweight team, having been to 5 World Championships winning a silver in LM4x.

Daniele Gilardoni joined Agecroft in February 2013 where he rowed and coached.

Henley Royal Regatta
At HRR, under the coaching of Denis O'Neill, the club, in successive years lost a semi-final by one foot, then a Final, then a semifinal, after which Agecroft won for the first time The Britannia Challenge Cup in 2009.  In other highest results:

Brendan Crean reached the semi-final of the 1x Diamond Challenge Sculls ('the Diamonds'), 2010
An Agecroft World Class Start 4x reached the semi-final Prince of Wales Challenge Cup, 2011 setting a course record.
Graeme Thomas reached the final of the Diamonds, 2012, he won the Queen Mother Cup in 2014, 2015 and 2018. He won Double Sculls Challenge Cup in 2019 and the Diamond Challenge Sculls in 2021.

Henley Women's Regatta 

Recent successes include the following wins

2010 Sen 1x  in a course record 
2011 Elite 8+ (composite) 
2012 Elite 8+ (composite) 
2013 Elite 4- (composite) 
2014 Elite 8+ and Elite LW4x (both composite) 
2016 Senior 4x 
2018 Development 4+ and Junior 1x 
2021 Development 4+

Junior rowing 

The junior section of Agecroft was restarted in earnest in the 2000s with dedicated junior club officers and has over 60 members racing locally and at British Junior Rowing Championships (see below)

Masters rowing 

The Masters squad was reformed in 2006/7 after the considerable success of the Agecroft Veteran squad in the 90's. From a starting point of just two members, the masters squad has circa 20 members with strong performances in the 35-50 age groups (B and C racing categories) at local, regional and national events. 
The squad has recorded the following wins at the British Masters Rowing Championships
B4- in 2015, 2016 and 2017, 
C8+ in 2019  
C4- in 2021.

At Henley Masters Regatta there have been wins in 
B4- in 2017, 
B8+ in 2018 
whilst they were finalists in B8+ 2019 and C4- 2021

Honours

British champions

Henley Royal Regatta

Notable members
Notable members include:

 Rebecca Chin
 Zak Lee-Green
 Graeme Thomas
 Olivia Whitlam

Gallery

Notes and references
Notes 
  
References

External links 
 Agecroft Rowing Club
 Agecroft Rowing Club archive at John Rylands Library, Manchester.

Rowing clubs in England
Sports clubs established in 1861
Sport in the City of Salford
1861 establishments in England